Five persons have been made honorary citizens of Schleswig-Holstein (Land, i.e. state of the Federal Republic of Germany):

Gerhard Stoltenberg, former Ministerpräsident (i.e. prime minister)  of Schleswig-Holstein and former defence and finance minister of Germany
Uwe Ronneburger, former chairman of the FDP (liberal party) of Schleswig-Holstein
Helmut Schmidt, former German Bundeskanzler (engl.: chancellor, i.e. head of government)
Siegfried Lenz, distinguished German author, who partly lives in Tetenhusen near Flensburg. Schleswig-Holstein is the location of many of his stories.
Leonard Bernstein, renowned American conductor and composer, who was awarded honorary citizenship of Schleswig-Holstein three years prior to his death in 1990.

Schleswig-Holstein, Honorary Citizens of
Schleswig-Holstein
Schleswig-Holstein-related lists